The Peruvian Naval Aviation is the air branch of the Peruvian Navy. It was originally formed in 1919 as the Naval Aviators Corps (Cuerpo de Aviadores Navales) but was merged in 1932 with the Peruvian Army Aviation. The service was recreated under its current name on July 3, 1963. It is currently made up of three operational squadrons and the Naval Aviation School (Escuela de Aviación Naval). The squadrons are distributed among three bases: Lima-Callao, which is part of Lima's Jorge Chávez International Airport, San Juan de Marcona and Pucallpa. About 800 personnel comprise Peruvian Naval Aviation.

Organization

Naval Air Squadron 11 
Tasked as maritime surveillance squadron, also undertakes MEDEVAC and transportation roles. Is based in the Callao Aeronaval Station at Jorge Chavez Airport.
Fokker 60 MPA
Beechcraft 200T Super King Air
Fokker 50 SIGINT

Naval Air Squadron 21 
Embarked for anti-submarine and anti-surface warfare missions for the Lupo-class frigate.
Kaman SH-2G(P) Super Seasprite
Agusta-Bell AB-212ASW

Naval Air Squadron 22
Had assigned the entire Sea King fleet, provides anti-submarine, anti-surface and general utility roles from ashore or embarked in the largest units of the fleet.

Agusta-Sikorsky ASH-3D Sea King
Sikorsky UH-3H Sea King

Naval Air Squadron 23 
Provides logistical support and general utility helicopters

Agusta-Bell AB-412SP

Naval Air Squadron 31 
Basic training squadron for fixed-wing pilots, based at San Juan de Marcona aeronaval station.

Beech T-34C-1 Turbo Mentor

Naval Air Squadron 32
Heavy-duty and general transportation squadron, operated also in the Amazon basin and VRAEM, includes:

Fokker 60 UTA
Antonov An-32B
Cessna 206 Stationair
Mil Mi-8T

Naval Air Squadron 33 
Training squadron for helicopter pilots, also based at San Juan de Marcona.

Enstrom F-28F

Aircraft

Recently decommissioned aircraft

Gallery

References

External links
 Official website 

Peruvian Navy
Naval aviation services
Aviation in Peru